Boiled eggs are eggs, typically from a chicken, cooked with their shells unbroken, usually by immersion in boiling water. Hard-boiled eggs are cooked so that the egg white and egg yolk both solidify, while soft-boiled eggs may leave the yolk, and sometimes the white, at least partially liquid and raw. Boiled eggs are a popular breakfast food around the world.

Besides a boiling water immersion, there are a few different methods to make boiled eggs. Eggs can also be cooked below the boiling temperature, i.e. coddling, or they can be steamed. The egg timer was named for commonly being used to time the boiling of eggs.

Variations

There are variations both in degree of cooking and in the method of how eggs are boiled, and a variety of kitchen gadgets for eggs exist. These variations include:
Piercing Some pierce the shell beforehand with an egg piercer to prevent cracking. Ekelund  et al. in Why eggs should not be pierced claimed that pricking caused egg white proteins to be damaged and was therefore to be discouraged. Others, including the American Egg Board, recommend against this, as it can introduce bacteria and create hairline cracks in the shell through which bacteria can enter the egg.
Steaming Eggs can be taken straight from the refrigerator and placed in the steamer at full steam.  
Baked eggs Baking eggs in an oven instead of boiling in water.

Soft-boiled eggs

Chef Heston Blumenthal, after "relentless trials", published a recipe for "the perfect boiled egg" suggesting cooking the egg in water that starts cold and covers the egg by no more than a millimeter, removing the pan from the heat as soon as the water starts to bubble. After six minutes, the egg will be ready.

Soft-boiled eggs are not recommended for people who may be susceptible to salmonella, such as very young children, the elderly, and those with weakened immune systems. To avoid the issue of salmonella, eggs can be pasteurised in shell at 57 °C for an hour and 15 minutes. The eggs can then be soft-boiled as normal.

Soft-boiled eggs are commonly served in egg cups, where the top of the egg is cut off with a knife, spoon, spring-loaded egg topper, or egg scissors, using an egg spoon to scoop the egg out. Other methods include breaking the eggshell by tapping gently around the top of the shell with a spoon.  Soft-boiled eggs can be eaten with toast cut into strips, which are then dipped into the runny yolk.  In the United Kingdom and Australia, these strips of toast are known as "soldiers".

In Southeast Asia, a variation of soft-boiled eggs known as half-boiled eggs are commonly eaten at breakfast. The major difference is that, instead of the egg being served in an egg cup, it is cracked into a bowl to which dark or light soy sauce or pepper are added. The egg is also cooked for a shorter period of time resulting in a runnier egg instead of the usual gelatin state and is commonly eaten with Kaya toast, Kopi O, or Milo chocolate milk.

Boiled eggs are also an ingredient in various Philippine dishes, such as embutido, pancit, relleno, galantina, and many others.

In Japan, soft-boiled eggs are commonly served alongside ramen. The eggs are typically steeped in a mixture of soy sauce, mirin, and water after being boiled and peeled. This provides the egg a brownish color that would otherwise be absent from boiling and peeling the eggs alone. Once the eggs have finished steeping, they are served either in the soup or on the side.

Hard-boiled eggs
  
Hard-boiled eggs are boiled long enough for the yolk to solidify. They can be eaten warm or cold. Hard-boiled eggs are the basis for many dishes, such as egg salad, cobb salad and Scotch eggs, and may be further prepared as deviled eggs.

There are several theories as to the proper technique of hard-boiling an egg, depending on circumstances. One method is to bring water to a boil and cook for ten minutes.  Another method is to bring the water to a boil, but then remove the pan from the heat and allow eggs to cook in the gradually cooling water. Over-cooking eggs will typically result in a thin green iron(II) sulfide coating on the yolk. This reaction occurs more rapidly in older eggs as the whites are more alkaline. Immersing the egg in cold water after boiling is a common method of halting the cooking process to prevent this effect. It also causes a slight shrinking of the contents of the egg.

Hard-boiled eggs should be used within two hours if kept at room temperature or can be used for a week if kept refrigerated and in the shell.

Hard-boiled eggs are commonly sliced, particularly for use in sandwiches. For this purpose specialized egg slicers exist, to ease slicing and yield even slices. For consistent slice sizes in food service, several eggs may have their yolk and white separated and poured into a cylindrical mold for stepwise hard-boiling, to produce what is known as a "long egg" or an "egg loaf". The machine for producing long eggs was first introduced in 1974. In addition to being sliced, long eggs can also be used in their entirety in gala pies.

Peeling
Boiled eggs can vary widely in how easy it is to peel away the shells.  In general, the fresher an egg before boiling, the more difficult it is to separate the shell cleanly from the egg white. As a fresh egg ages, it gradually loses both moisture and carbon dioxide through pores in the shell; as a consequence, the contents of the egg shrink and the pH of the albumen becomes more basic.  Albumen with higher pH (more basic) is less likely to stick to the egg shell, while pockets of air develop in eggs that have lost significant amounts of moisture, also making eggs easier to peel. Keeping the cooked eggs soaked in water helps keep the membrane under the egg shell moisturized for easy peeling. Peeling the egg under cold running water is an effective method of removing the shell.  Starting the cooking in hot water also makes the egg easier to peel. It is often claimed that steaming eggs in a pressure cooker makes them easier to peel.  Double blind testing has failed to show any advantage of pressure cooking over steaming, and has further shown that starting boiling in cold water is counterproductive. Shocking the eggs by rapidly cooling them helped, and cooling them in ice water for 15 minutes or longer gave more successful peeling. Shocking was also found to remove the dimple in the base of the egg caused by the air space.

Dishes featuring boiled eggs
Boiled eggs often form part of larger, more elaborate dishes. For example, a boiled egg may garnish a bowl of ramen (often first marinated in soy sauce), be baked into a pie such as a torta pasqualina, or be encased in aspic (similar to the French dish œufs en gelée, which features poached eggs), be chopped and mixed with mayonnaise to form egg salad, or be deep-fried and then baked within a serving of Lamprais.

See also

 Coddled egg
 Deviled egg
 Egg piercer
 Haminados
 List of egg dishes
 Pickled beet egg
 Tea egg

Notes

References

External links

 Basic Hard-Cooked Eggs, American Egg Board
 Boiling an Egg – Science Background
 Boiling of eggs for molecular gastronomers
 wiki articles on how to  boil an egg, poach an egg, and soft boil an egg. An overview of all processes for boiling eggs.

Egg dishes